Wayne Pride (born 29 June 1943) is an Australian country music and memory lane musician, who started his career in 1959 as a vocalist and guitarist in Sydney, Australia. He has toured with Charley Pride and Buddy Williams, made over 100 television appearances. Pride won the 'Best Entertainer' category at the Western Australian Country Music Awards in 1986, 1989 and 1991. He was the opening act for Don Williams in early 2004. Later in 2004 Pride travelled to the United States to meet Dwight Peters, together they wrote "Smoky Mountain Memories". He returned to the US in 2008 to continue his work with Peters. Pride has performed with Willie Nelson.

Biography
Wayne Pride was born on 29 June 1943 and started his musical career in Sydney in 1959. Since 1964, Pride has idolised US country artist, Roger Miller, he worked with Miller's brothers Duane and Wendell to create a tribute show. He has written a book, Three Little Boys on the brothers. He performed the tribute show, Hero, from November 2009. He won the 'Best Entertainer' category at the Western Australian Country Music Awards in 1986, 1989 and 1991.

Discography

TV Appearances
 TVW 7 (1965–2000) Includes Perth Telethon, In Perth Tonight, Turpie Tonight
 Nine Network Appealathon: 9
 GWN: Telehelp
 NWS9: Woodie's Teen Time 1961
 NWS9: Reg Lindsay's C&W Hour Adelaide Several Appearances
 Nine Network: Pad 9 1965

Radio Interviews
 Curtin Radio Perth
 6EBA Perth
 ABC Radio Australia 720 Perth: Earl Reeve Country Music Show

Notes

References 

1943 births
Living people
Australian country guitarists
Australian male guitarists
Australian country singers
Australian male singers